Picnicface was a Canadian sketch comedy troupe based in Halifax, Nova Scotia, consisting of Mark Little, Andrew Bush, Kyle Dooley, Cheryl Hann, Brian MacQuarrie, Evany Rosen, Scott Vrooman and Bill Wood. Formed in 2006, the group were most noted for a 13-episode sketch comedy television series which aired on The Comedy Network in 2011.

Background
The group has performed in Vancouver, Edmonton, Toronto, and other Canadian cities. They have had a special on CBC Radio and had a weekly sketch and improv comedy show in Halifax.
 
In 2011, Picnicface were featured in a film called Roller Town and a satirical book about Canada for HarperCollins Canada called Picnicface's Canada.

Television series

Thirteen episodes have been ordered by The Comedy Network. Picnicface aired on Wednesday nights at 10:30 pm Eastern/9:30 pm Central. The series was executive-produced by Mark McKinney from The Kids in the Hall.

The series won three Canadian Comedy Awards at the 13th Canadian Comedy Awards in 2012, for Best TV Series, Best Ensemble and Best Writing in a TV Series.

In late April 2012, Bell Media, the network's owner, decided not to renew the series for a second season.

Episodes

Later work
In 2013, Bush created the comedy web series Everyone's Famous, which received two Canadian Screen Award nominations at the 2nd Canadian Screen Awards. In 2018, Bush and Little created and starred in the comedy series Cavendish, which premiered on CBC Television in January 2019.

Rosen was one of the creators, alongside Kayla Lorette, of the comedy web series New Eden.

References

External links

2010s Canadian sketch comedy television series
2011 Canadian television series debuts
2011 Canadian television series endings
CTV Comedy Channel original programming
Canadian comedy troupes
Comedy collectives
Canadian Comedy Award winners